Below is a list of nominations and appointments to the Department of the Treasury by Joe Biden, the 46th president of the United States. , according to tracking by The Washington Post and Partnership for Public Service, 18 nominees have been confirmed, 1 nominee is being considered by the Senate, 3 positions do not have nominees, and 12 appointments have been made to positions that don't require Senate confirmation.

Color key 
 Denotes appointees awaiting Senate confirmation.

 Denotes appointees serving in an acting capacity.

 Denotes appointees who have left office or offices which have been disbanded.

Leadership

Office of the Secretary & Deputy Secretary

Office of the Treasurer of the United States

Office of Domestic Finance

Office of Financial Research

Office of International Affairs

Office of Terrorism and Financial Intelligence

Community Development Advisory Board

Internal Revenue Service

Withdrawn nominations

See also 
 Cabinet of Joe Biden, for the vetting process undergone by top-level roles including advice and consent by the Senate
 List of executive branch 'czars' e.g. Special Advisor to the President

Notes 

Confirmations by roll call vote

Confirmations by voice vote

References 

 Biden
Treasury